Reverend Monsignor Joseph G. Prior is the former rector of St. Charles Borromeo Seminary in Philadelphia, Pennsylvania, United States. Msgr. Prior is the current pastor at Our Lady of Grace, Penndel, (Langhorne) Pennsylvania, which is a part of the Archdiocese of Philadelphia.

Ordination
1990 Ordination to Priesthood for the Archdiocese of Philadelphia

Education
S.T.D. Pontifical Gregorian University, Rome, Italy  
S.S.L. Pontifical Biblical Institute, Rome, Italy  
M.A. Saint Charles Borromeo Seminary, Overbrook 
M.Div. Saint Charles Borromeo Seminary, Overbrook 
B.A., Philosophy Saint Charles Borromeo Seminary, Overbrook

Chronology
2004-2010, Saint Charles Borromeo Seminary
2002-2004 Chief Academic Officer, Saint Charles Borromeo Seminary
2000-2002 Academic Dean, Theology Division, Saint Charles Borromeo Seminary
1999–2010 Faculty, Saint Charles Borromeo Seminary, Theology Division 
1999–2010 Censor Librorum, Archdiocese of Philadelphia  
1991–2010 Adjunct Faculty, Saint Charles Borromeo Seminary, Religious Studies Division 
1991-1992 CYO Regional Director, Region 12

Pastoral Assignments
Current: Pastor, Our Lady of Grace, Penndel PA

2010–2017, Pastor, St. John the Evangelist, Morrisville, PA
1992-1993 Faculty, St. James High School, Chester, PA  
1990-1992 Associate Pastor, Our Lady of Good Counsel Parish, Southampton, PA

Core Courses Taught
GRK 301 Elementary Greek I 
GRK 302 Elementary Greek II 
INT 801 Comprehensive Synthesis: Scriptural, Systematic, Moral and Pastoral Integration 
RS 108 Themes for Old Testament Wisdom Writings 
RS 109 Another Look at the Prophets 
RS 152 Jesus in the Four Gospels 
RS 501 Foundational Course in Sacred Scripture 
RS 541 Epistles of St. Paul  
SCR 501 Critical Introduction to Sacred Scripture 
SCR 604 Pauline Epistles 
SCR 803 Johannine Literature 
THL 203 Introduction to Scripture

Professional Memberships
The Catholic Biblical Association of America (1998–Present)

Society of Biblical Literature (1999–Present)

College Theology Society (2000–Present)

Lectures

"Biblical Hermeneutics," Archdiocese of Philadelphia Permanent Diaconate Workshop, 2002, 2003, 2004, 2005.

"The Third Missing Journey of > St. Paul (Acts 18:23-21:14 ," Archdiocese of Philadelphia, Spring Priests' Workshop, 2003.

Publications
The Historical Critical Method in Catholic Exegesis, Tesi Gregoriana 50, Rome 1999 (Dissertation) 
"Sancta Mater Ecclesia" in The Bible Documents, Liturgical Press, (Collegeville 2001).

Living people
Year of birth missing (living people)
American Roman Catholic priests
Roman Catholic Archdiocese of Philadelphia
Religious leaders from Pennsylvania